Leap Into Life is a 1924 German silent drama film directed by Johannes Guter and starring Xenia Desni, Walter Rilla and Paul Heidemann. It features one the earliest film appearances of the future star Marlene Dietrich.

It was partly shot at the Johannisthal Studios in Berlin as well as on location around Rugen. The film's sets were designed by Rudi Feld.

Synopsis
A young intellectual falls in love with a circus performer and decides to cultivate her into a lady and marry her. Eventually however she decides to return to her tightrope walker lover.

Cast
 Xenia Desni as Idea - Zirkusartistin
 Walter Rilla as Frank - Ideas Partner
 Paul Heidemann as Dr. Rudolf Borris
 Frida Richard as Rudolfs Tante Sophie
 Käthe Haack as Dr. Borris' Sekretärin
 Leonhard Haskel Le as Zirkusdirektor
 Lydia Potechina as Frau des Zirkusdirektors
 Dr. Gebbing as Dompteur
 Hans Brausewetter as Borris' Freund
 Marlene Dietrich as Mädchen am Strand
 Hans Heinrich von Twardowski as Geiger
 Max Gülstorff as Geiger
 Erling Hanson
 Max Valentin
 Ernst Pröckl
 Hermann Thimig

References

Bibliography
 Chandler, Charlotte. Marlene: Marlene Dietrich, A Personal Biography. Simon and Schuster, 2011.

External links 
 

1924 films
Films of the Weimar Republic
German silent feature films
Films directed by Johannes Guter
Circus films
1924 drama films
German drama films
UFA GmbH films
Films shot at Johannisthal Studios
German black-and-white films
Silent drama films
1920s German films